Almudena Parejo Amor (born 30 March 1994), artistically known as Almudena Amor, is a Spanish actress. She has starred in the films The Good Boss and The Grandmother.

Biography 
Almudena Parejo Amor was born on 30 March 1994 in Madrid. Part of her family comes from Lagartera (Toledo), a village in which she spent many summers and weekends during her youth. Raised in the Concepción neighborhood, she developed an interest in acting during some theatrical courses organised in her high school in Ciudad Lineal. She trained her acting chops in Carabanchel at the Mar Navarro acting school. She earned a degree in publicity and a master's degree in design. She worked for a time as a model afterwards. Determined to develop an acting career, she performed in some short films, commercials and music videos. After performing in a teaser video by Gonzaga Manso titled Millones de años, she was inked by agent Diana Ellerker, and she ensuingly landed the leading role in Paco Plaza's The Grandmother, playing the role of Susana, a young model who has to return home to take care of her grandmother. She also made a minor appearance in the Plaza-directed episode "Freddy" from the anthology television series Stories to Stay Awake. Her breakthrough role as Liliana (a young company intern from a well-off family infatuated with the boss) in Fernando León de Aranoa's The Good Boss earned her a nomination to the Goya Award for Best New Actress and a nomination to the Feroz Award for Best Supporting Actress.

Filmography 

Film

Television

Accolades

References 

21st-century Spanish actresses
Spanish film actresses
1994 births
Actresses from Madrid
Living people